Scientific Production Association Of Automation And Instrument-Building, also known as the Academician Pilyugin Center is a company based in Moscow, Russia. It is currently a Roscosmos subsidiary.

The Scientific Production Association of Automated Instruments develops guidance, navigation, and flight control systems for ballistic missiles, space launch vehicles, and spacecraft. It has produced systems for the Soyuz, Proton, N1, and Zenit launch vehicles; the Moon, Mars, Venus, and Vega probes; the Buran space shuttle; and the intercontinental ballistic missiles.

In 1997 it was named after Nikolay Pilyugin, the first director of the institute.

References

External links

 

Manufacturing companies of Russia
Companies based in Moscow
Roscosmos divisions and subsidiaries
Federal State Unitary Enterprises of Russia
Ministry of General Machine-Building (Soviet Union)
Aerospace companies of the Soviet Union